Holstein is a city in Ida County, Iowa, United States. The population was 1,501 in the 2020 census, a 2% increase from 1,470 in 2000.

History
Holstein was founded in 1882. A large share of the early settlers being natives of Holstein, in Germany, caused the name to be selected. Holstein was incorporated as a city on April 25, 1883. The city celebrated its Quasquicentennial in June 2007 with a week-long series of events.

Geography
Holstein's longitude and latitude coordinates in decimal form are 42.486794, -95.542565.

Climate

Demographics

2010 census
As of the census of 2010, there were 1,396 people, 616 households, and 354 families living in the city. The racial makeup of the city was 97.7% White, 0.1% African American, 0.2% Native American, 0.1% Asian, 0.7% from other races, and 1.1% from two or more races. Hispanic or Latino of any race were 2.0% of the population.

There were 616 households, of which 26.3% had children under the age of 18 living with them, 48.9% were married couples living together, 7.1% had a female householder with no husband present, 1.5% had a male householder with no wife present, and 42.5% were non-families. 37.3% of all households were made up of individuals, and 16.6% had someone living alone who was 65 years of age or older. The average household size was 2.18 and the average family size was 2.91.

The median age in the city was 44.1 years. 23.5% of residents were under the age of 18; 5.3% were between the ages of 18 and 24; 22.2% were from 25 to 44; 25.2% were from 45 to 64; and 23.7% were 65 years of age or older. The gender makeup of the city was 49.1% male and 50.9% female.

2000 census
As of the census of 2000, there were 1,470 people, 627 households, and 406 families living in the city. The racial makeup of the city was 99.18% White, 0.07% Native American, 0.27% Asian, 0.07% from other races, and 0.41% from two or more races. Hispanic or Latino of any race were 0.34% of the population.

There were 627 households, out of which 27.3% had children under the age of 18 living with them, 55.3% were married couples living together, 7.5% had a female householder with no husband present, and 35.1% were non-families. 32.4% of all households were made up of individuals, and 19.1% had someone living alone who was 65 years of age or older. The average household size was 2.26 and the average family size was 2.84.

23.2% were under the age of 18, 6.4% from 18 to 24, 22.0% from 25 to 44, 20.4% from 45 to 64, and 28.0% were 65 years of age or older. The median age was 44 years. For every 100 females, there were 80.1 males. For every 100 females age 18 and over, there were 79.8 males.

The median income for a household in the city was $35,250, and the median income for a family was $43,636. Males had a median income of $30,259 versus $20,958 for females. The per capita income for the city was $17,941. About 5.7% of families and 9.1% of the population were below the poverty line, including 7.9% of those under age 18 and 13.1% of those age 65 or over.

Education
Holstein Public Schools are part of the Galva–Holstein Community School District. It was established on July 1, 1980, by the merger of the merger of the Galva and Holstein school districts.

Notable people 

Biggs Wehde (1906–1970), American Major League Baseball pitcher who played in 1930 and 1931 with the Chicago White Sox.
Lauren K. Soth (1910–1998), attended Holstein High School, he was a journalist and editor, and he won the Pulitzer Prize award.

References

External links

City of Holstein, Iowa Portal style website, Government, Businesses, Community activities, and more
City-Data Comprehensive Statistical Data and more about Holstein
Galva-Holstein School District

Cities in Iowa
Cities in Ida County, Iowa